Synodontis ngouniensis is a species of upside-down catfish native to the Republic of the Congo and Gabon, where it occurs in the Ngounié and upper Nyanga river basins. This species grows to a length of  SL.

References

Further reading

External links 

ngouniensis
Taxa named by David De Weirdt
Taxa named by Emmanuel J. Vreven
Taxa named by Yves Fermon
Catfish of Africa
Fish of the Republic of the Congo
Fish of Gabon
Fish described in 2008